Hameed Rashid  (born 8 January 1963) is a former Iraqi football defender who played for Iraq in the 1985 Pan Arab Games and 1985 Arab Nations Cup.

Hadi played for the national team between 1985 and 1988.

References

Iraqi footballers
Iraq international footballers
Living people
Association football forwards
1963 births